Sticky Fingers is a 1971 album by the Rolling Stones. 

Sticky Fingers may also refer to:

Books
Sticky Fingers (book), a 2017 book by Joe Hagan

People
 Sticky Fingaz, member of the hip hop group Onyx

Films
 Sticky Fingers (1988 film), directed by Catlin Adams
 Sticky Fingers (2009 film), directed by Ken Scott

Music
 Sticky Fingers (band), an Australian reggae rock band
 Sticky Fingers (tribute band), United States-based The Rolling Stones tribute band

Television
 "Sticky Fingers" (1999), an episode from 2point4 children, Series 8

Other uses
 Sticky Fingers, the ability, or "Stand" of Bruno Bucciarati, a character in the manga Golden Wind